The 2013 CPISRA Football 7-a-side Intercontinental Cup was an international championship for men's national 7-a-side association football teams. CPISRA stands for Cerebral Palsy International Sports & Recreation Association. Athletes with a physical disability competed. The Championship took place in the Sant Cugat del Vallès from 27 July to 10 August 2013.

Football 7-a-side was played with modified FIFA rules. Among the modifications were that there were seven players, no offside, a smaller playing field, and permission for one-handed throw-ins. Matches consisted of two thirty-minute halves, with a fifteen-minute half-time break. The Championships was a qualifying event for the 2015 IFCPF CP Football World Championships.

Participating teams and officials

Qualifying
The following teams are qualified for the tournament:

The draw
During the draw, the teams were divided into pots because of rankings. Here, the following groups:

Squads

Group A

Group B

Group C

Group D

Venues
The venues to be used for the Intercontinental Cup were located in Sant Cugat del Vallès.

Format

The first round, or group stage, was a competition between the 16 teams divided among four groups of four, where each group engaged in a round-robin tournament within itself. The two highest ranked teams in each group advanced to the knockout stage for the position one to eight. the two lower ranked teams plays for the positions nine to 16. Teams were awarded three points for a win and one for a draw. When comparing teams in a group over-all result came before head-to-head.

In the knockout stage there were three rounds (quarter-finals, semi-finals, and the final). The winners plays for the higher positions, the losers for the lower positions. For any match in the knockout stage, a draw after 60 minutes of regulation time was followed by two 10 minute periods of extra time to determine a winner. If the teams were still tied, a penalty shoot-out was held to determine a winner.

Classification
Athletes with a physical disability competed. The athlete's disability was caused by a non-progressive brain damage that affects motor control, such as cerebral palsy, traumatic brain injury or stroke. Athletes must be ambulant.

Players were classified by level of disability.
C5: Athletes with difficulties when walking and running, but not in standing or when kicking the ball.
C6: Athletes with control and co-ordination problems of their upper limbs, especially when running.
C7: Athletes with hemiplegia.
C8: Athletes with minimal disability; must meet eligibility criteria and have an impairment that has impact on the sport of football.

Teams must field at least one class C5 or C6 player at all times. No more than two players of class C8 are permitted to play at the same time.

Group stage
The first round, or group stage, have seen the sixteen teams divided into four groups of four teams.

Group A

Group B

Group C

Group D

Knockout stage

Quarter-finals
Position 9-16

Position 1-8

Semi-finals
Position 12-16

Position 9-12

Position 5-8

Position 1-4

Finals
Position 15-16

Position 13-14

Position 11-12

Position 9-10

Position 7-8

Position 5-6

Position 3-4

Final

Statistics

Goalscorers
9 goals

  Oleksandr Devlysh

8 goals

  Jonathan Paterson

7 goals

  Matthew Brown
  Mariano Andrés Morana

6 goals

  Ronaldo de Souza Almeida
  Michael Barker
  Vitalii Romanchuk
  Jack Rutter

5 goals

  Gerad Arends
  Alexey Chesmin
  Lars Conijn
  Rene Renteria
  Dillon Sheridan
  Ivan Shkvarlo
  Wanderson Silva de Oliveira
  Iljas Visker

4 goals

  Taras Dutko
  Jan Francisco Costa
  Aleksandr Kuligin
  Rodrigo Eloy Lugrín
  Rodrigo Adolfo Luquez
  Matias Fernandez
  André Ricardo Silva Ferreira
  Zaurbek Pegaev
  Eduard Ramonov
  Tiago Ramos
  Luciano Silva
  Ryan Walker

3 goals

  Georgiy Albegov
  Volodymyr Antonyuk
  Cormac Birt
  Marcos Yuri Costa
  Mamuka Dzimistarishvili
  Martin Hickman
  Peter Kooij
  Stephan Lokhoff
  Josh McKinney
  Denys Ponomaryov
  Emilio Ribeiro
  Pedro Santos
  Thomas Smith
  Evandro Souza
  Stiles Trevor
  Fernandes Vieira

2 goals

  Jamie Ackinclose
  Joao Batista Araújo
  Sergio Clemente
  Nicholas Fish
  Blair Glynn
  Ezequiel Anival Jaime
  David Leavy
  Gary Messet
  Lasha Murvanadze
  Ruben Oliveira
  Raúl Pacheco
  Mark Robertson
  Rik Rondenburg
  Emyle Rudder
  Antonio Silva
  Daragh Snell
  Vitaliy Trushev
  Aleksey Tumakov
  Marthell Vazquez

1 goal

  Chris Ahrens
  Juan Albert Alabarce
  Fabricio Gabriel Alvarez
  Harry Baker
  David Barber
  Tyler Bennett
  Nuno Bogas
  Daragh Byrne
  Tiago Carneiro
  Samuel Charron
  Fabio Miguel Coria
  Minne de Vos
  Daan Dikken
  Luke Evans
  Marcos Ferreira
  Stephen Halpin
  Dustin Hodgson
  Jordan Kearns
  Ryan Kinner
  Viacheslav Larionov
  Connor Marsh
  Jaime Mitchell
  Dmytro Molodtsov
  Brayan Andrés Moreno
  Alexander Mullin
  Ryan Nolan
  Oliver Nugent
  Cleiton Oliveira
  Jorge Peleteiro
  Chris Pyne
  Carlos Rodriguez
  Martin Sinclair
  Liam Stanley
  Taisei Taniguchi
  Saul Eliecer Torres
  Karl Townshend
  Tatsuhiro Ura
  Vitor Vilarinho
  Yevhen Zinoviev

own goals

  Chris Duehrsen

Ranking

See also

References

External links
Official website of December, 18, 2013
Cerebral Palsy International Sports & Recreation Association (CPISRA)
International Federation of Cerebral Palsy Football (IFCPF)

2013 in association football
2013
2012–13 in Spanish football
Paralympic association football
CP football